Matt O'Hea (born 3 September 1982) is a professional basketball player from Moe, Victoria.

External links 
http://www.tigers.com.au/default.aspx?s=playerprofile&id=677&team=tigers

1982 births
Living people
Australian men's basketball players
Melbourne Tigers players
People from Moe, Victoria
Guards (basketball)